Miltiadis Sapanis (born 28 January 1976) is a Greek former professional footballer who played as a midfielder.

Club career
Sapanis previously played for Paniliakos, Panathinaikos FC and AEK Athens in the Greek Super League. He won the double with Panathinaikos in season 2003-04. He also played for Cypriot side APOEL where he helped the team to win the 2006–07 Cypriot First Division. Then he returned to Greece and played for Ionikos FC and Kavala, before moving to Agrotikos Asteras.His brother Ilias Sapanis is also a former football player, who played professional in Greece and Italy.

International career
Sapanis played for Greece at the 2004 Olympic Games.

Honours
Panathinaikos
Greek Super League: 2003–04
Greek Cup: 2004

APOEL
Cypriot First Division: 2006–07

References

External links

Myplayer Profile

1976 births
Living people
Greek footballers
Super League Greece players
Cypriot First Division players
Paniliakos F.C. players
Panathinaikos F.C. players
AEK Athens F.C. players
APOEL FC players
Ionikos F.C. players
Kavala F.C. players
Thrasyvoulos F.C. players
Iraklis Thessaloniki F.C. players
Naoussa F.C. players
Expatriate footballers in Cyprus
Footballers at the 2004 Summer Olympics
Olympic footballers of Greece
Association football midfielders
People from Thessaloniki (regional unit)
Footballers from Central Macedonia